The White Salmon River is a  tributary of the Columbia River in the U.S. state of Washington. Originating on the slopes of Mount Adams, it flows into the Columbia Gorge near the community of Underwood. Parts of the river have been designated Wild and Scenic. The principal tributaries of the White Salmon River include Trout Lake and Buck, Mill, Dry, Gilmer, and Rattlesnake Creeks.

Wild and Scenic
In 1986, the lower White Salmon River was designated Wild and Scenic between Gilmer Creek and Buck Creek. In 2005, the upper river between the headwaters and the boundary of the Gifford Pinchot National Forest was added to the designation. On the upper stretches of the White Salmon River near the Trout Lake Farming Community there are a few irrigation dams on the White Salmon River. These irrigation dams may be full/partial barriers to resident trout populations.

Recreation
The White Salmon River is used for whitewater boating nearly year-round. A popular spot to launch a raft or kayak is the public put-in at the unincorporated community of BZ Corner. The day-use area at the put-in includes parking, restrooms, and toilets. Full day whitewater tours will also take visitors rafting through the former Condit Dam/Northwestern Lake portion of the White Salmon River and to the Columbia River confluence. Guided whitewater trips can be arranged with commercial outfitters with special-use permits for the White Salmon.

Condit Dam demolition
On October 26, 2011, the Condit Dam on the White Salmon River was intentionally breached as part of the dam's decommissioning by PacifiCorp. The breach allowed the river to flow unimpeded for the first time in nearly a century.

See also
List of Washington rivers
List of National Wild and Scenic Rivers
Condit Hydroelectric Project
Tributaries of the Columbia River
Trout Lake Mudflow

References

External links
Dam-breaching video - YouTube
Friends of the White Salmon
Photo of the river below the dam
USGS map of the area
The White Salmon River Runs Free: Breaching the Condit Dam  Documentary produced by Oregon Field Guide

Rivers of Washington (state)
Columbia River Gorge
Wild and Scenic Rivers of the United States
Mount Adams (Washington)
Gifford Pinchot National Forest
Tributaries of the Columbia River
Rivers of Klickitat County, Washington
Rivers of Skamania County, Washington